K. K. Rajeev is a director from the Malayalam television industry.

Career
His most famous serials are Peythozhiyathe, Venal mazha, Swapnam, Avicharitham, Amma Manassu, Kudumbayogam, Orma, Mazhayariyathe, Kadhayile Rajakumari, Oru Penninte Kadha and Eshwaran Sakshiyayi. In 2009, Rajeev produced a TV serial based on the late writer and director Padmarajan's famous work Vadakaku oru Hridayam. The script for the serial has been written by Padmarajan's son Ananthapadmanaphan.In his career as a film director, he won many awards which includes the state award he won for directing Avicharitam telecasted in Asianet.His debut film in Malayalam cinema is Njanum Ente Familiyum starring Jayaram, Mamta Mohandas, Mythili, Manoj K. Jayan, Jagathy Sreekumar and Nedumudi Venu, which released in 2012.It was a flop at the box office.

Biography
During his school and college days he was very active in pursuing his hobbies of acting in and directing plays of well-known writers. A writer himself, he used to write short plays and direct it to present in school/college competitions. He used to bag the prizes for acting and direction. When he was an undergraduate commerce student in M S M College, Kayamkulam, his team took part in the Kerala University Youth festival drama competition and KK Rajeev won the 'Best Actor of the Year' award. He was the Arts Club Secretary of the college, in 1985. He is married to Honey Rajeev and has a son Vishnu Rajeev.

Television Soap Opera's

Awards
Kerala State Television Awards
2005 -Best Serial -Avicharitham
2005-Best Director  -Avicharitham
2010 - Best Serial - Agneyam
2010-Best Director  - Agneyam
2015-Best Serial  - Eshwaran Saakshiyayi
2016-Best Serial - Pokkuveyil
2021 - Special Jury - Anna Kareena 
Asianet Television Awards
2005-Best Serial- Swapnam
2005-Best Director- Avicharitham
2006-Best Serial- Orma
2006-Best Director -Orma
Atlas-Film Critics award 
2009-Best Serial -Agneyam
Kaveri Film critics Awards
2004-Best Serial - Avicharitham
2004-Best Director - Avicharitham
FLOWERS TV AWARDS 
2016 - Best Director - Eshwaran Saakshiyayi
2016 -Best Serial -Eshwaran Saakshiyayi

See also
 Malayalam cinema

References 

Living people
Malayalam film directors
Indian television directors
Film directors from Kerala
21st-century Indian film directors
Year of birth missing (living people)